The 2003 Italian Figure Skating Championships was held in Lecco from January 3 through 5, 2003. Skaters competed in the disciplines of men's singles, ladies' singles, and ice dancing. The results were used to choose the teams to the 2003 World Championships, the 2003 European Championships, and the 2003 World Junior Championships.

Senior results

Men

Ladies

Ice dancing

External links
 results

Italian Figure Skating Championships
2002 in figure skating
Italian Figure Skating Championships, 2003
2005 in Italian sport